MV Rhosus was a general cargo ship that was abandoned in Beirut, Lebanon, after the ship was declared unseaworthy and the charterers lost interest in the cargo. The 2,750 tonnes of ammonium nitrate which the ship was carrying was confiscated and brought to shore in 2014, and later contributed to the catastrophic 2020 Beirut explosion. The vessel's owner at the time of abandonment was Cyprus-based Russian businessman Igor Grechushkin. The ship sank in the Port of Beirut in 2018.

Description
The ship was normally run by around nine or ten crew members.

History
The ship was built by Tokuoka Zosen K.K. in Naruto, Japan, as the grab suction dredger Daifuku Maru No. 8 for the Japanese shipping company Daifuku Kaiun KK and delivered in October 1986. In 2002, the ship was sold to another Japanese shipping company, Nishi Nippon Kaiyo, but was reportedly sold already in March of the same year to a South Korean owner and renamed Seokjung No. 505.

In March 2005, the ship was sold to Hong Kong Zheng Long Shipping Co Ltd, renamed Zheng Long and registered briefly under the Belizean flag. In June of the same year, the ownership changed to another Hong Kong-based shipping company, Rui Hua (HK) Shipping Co Ltd, and the vessel was reflagged to Panama. In June 2007, the ship was sold to a Panamanian-registered company, Sea Star International Shipping Group Inc, and renamed New Legend Glory.

The ship's most recent reported registered owner, Panamanian-registered Briarwood Corp, acquired the vessel in August 2008 and renamed it Rhosus. By 2012, the vessel was effectively owned by  Cypriot businessman Charalambos Manoli, who sold it that year to Khabarovsk-born Russian businessman Igor Grechushkin, who was reported to be living in Limassol, Cyprus, in 2020. This was Grechushkin's first foray into running his own ship.

On , Rhosus was detained at the Port of Seville by Spanish port state control authorities due to a number of deficiencies.

Abandonment

In September 2013, the freighter was chartered to carry a cargo of high-density ammonium nitrate from Georgian fertilizer maker, Rustavi Azot LLC, in Georgia to be delivered to Fábrica de Explosivos Moçambique (FEM) in Matola, Mozambique. On , Rhosus set sail from Batumi bound to Beira carrying 2,750 tonnes of ammonium nitrate in bags, a cargo which the captain regarded as "dangerous", but not so dangerous that it could not be transported. On , the ship ported in Beirut. Some sources stated that it was forced to port due to mechanical issues and possibly engine problems, while other sources said that the owner did not have sufficient funds to pay tolls for the Suez Canal and attempted but failed to take on a shipment of heavy machinery from Beirut to Aqaba, Jordan. The heavy machinery was stacked over the hatch leading to the cargo space containing the ammonium nitrate, causing the hatch covers to buckle and damaging the ship. After inspection by port state control, Rhosus was found unseaworthy, and it was forbidden to set sail. Eight Ukrainians and one Russian were aboard, and with the help of a Ukrainian consul, five Ukrainians were repatriated, leaving the Russian captain and three Ukrainian crew members—the chief engineer, the third engineer, and the boatswain—to take care of the ship.

The owner of Rhosus, Igor Grechushkin, claimed to have become bankrupt and, after the charterers lost interest in the cargo, he abandoned the ship. Rhosus then quickly ran out of provisions, while the crew were unable to disembark due to immigration restrictions. The captain sold some fuel in the ship in order to pay for lawyers to free them from their confinement on the ship. Creditors also obtained three warrants to arrest the ship. According to Lloyd's List, the Beirut port authority seized the ship on 4 February 2014, due to US$100,000 in unpaid bills. The ship had accrued port fees and been fined for refusing cargo. Lawyers argued for the crew's repatriation on compassionate grounds, due to the danger posed by the cargo still aboard the ship, and an Urgent Matters judge in Beirut allowed them to return home after having been stuck aboard the ship for about a year.

Fate
In a 2020 interview, the former master of Rhosus stated that there was a small hole in the hull and, with no crew on board to periodically pump the sea water out, the vessel sank "two or three years ago" after the cargo had been unloaded. Euronews reported that the records of Lloyd's List showed that Rhosus was seized in February 2014, and that it sank without a crew in the breakwaters of the Port of Beirut in February 2018.
Subsequent analysis shows the ship to still lie there.

Since 2018, Rhosuss flag has been reported as "unknown" in official databases and the vessel's status was updated to "total loss" in August 2020.

Investigation
A thorough investigation by Der Spiegel and the Organized Crime and Corruption Reporting Project (OCCRP) into the 2020 Beirut explosion concluded that:
 A Cypriot businessman, Charalambos Manoli, might have been the owner, while Igor Grechushkin was merely leasing it through a company in the Marshall Islands called Teto Shipping Ltd.
 Panamanian-registered Briarwood Corp, which owned the vessel in August 2008, might belong to Manoli, according to a 2012 document found by OCCRP journalists.
 A Georgian company called Maritime Lloyd, owned by Manoli, certified the seaworthiness of the ailing freighter in late July 2013. But days later, Port of Seville authorities detained the ship, citing 14 defects, such as corroded decks, lack of auxiliary power, and problems with radio communication.
 During Rhosuss last voyage, Manoli owed €962,000 to FBME Bank, which is accused of helping the Shia militant group Hezbollah. However, Rhosus might have been offered up as collateral to the bank at one stage.
 Mozambican company, Fábrica de Explosivos Moçambique (FEM), which ordered the shipment, is 95 percent owned by the family of Portuguese businessman Antonio Moura Vieira, through a company called Moura Silva & Filhos, which was previously investigated for arms trafficking and supplying explosives used in the 2004 Madrid train bombings.
 The intermediary company, Savaro Ltd, hired a Lebanese lawyer in February 2015 to inspect the quality and quantity of the ammonium nitrate in the port warehouse. The experts reported that 1,900 out of 2,700 bags were ripped and had their contents spilling out. Hence, they did not try to take back the ammonium nitrate in the end.
 One of the warehouse's gates was missing, in addition to a large hole in the south wall, which caused fear that the ammonium nitrate might be stolen to be used as explosives.
 The size of the explosion was equivalent to only 700 to 1,000 tons of ammonium nitrate.

In October 2020, Lebanon's state-run National News Agency said that the country's state prosecution had asked Interpol to detain two Russian citizens, the captain and the owner of Rhosus, as its cargo of ammonium nitrate was blamed for the explosion.

Notes

References

1986 ships
Ships built in Japan
Maritime incidents in 2018
Merchant ships of Japan
Merchant ships of South Korea
Merchant ships of Belize
Cargo ships of Panama
Merchant ships of Georgia
Cargo ships of Moldova
Ships sunk with no fatalities
Shipwrecks in the Mediterranean Sea
2020 Beirut explosion